The Royal Project may refer to:
 The Royal Project (Thailand), a nonprofit organisation founded in 1969
 Das Königsprojekt, a 1974 German science fiction novel